Martin & Hall was the architectural partnership of Frank W. Martin (March 9, 1863 – February 2, 1917) and George F. Hall (1866–1928).  It was based in Providence, Rhode Island.

History
The firm was founded in February 1893 when the two men, who were both employed by Stone, Carpenter & Willson, decided to leave and open their own practice.  They brought some clients with them, resulting in a rift with their former firm.  Due to this, both were denied membership to the AIA until the deaths of Alfred Stone and Edmund R. Willson.

The firm was dissolved upon Martin's death in 1917. It was continued as Hall's private practice, who ran the office until his death in 1928.

Partner biographies
Frank Howard Martin was born in Seekonk, Massachusetts in 1863, just across the state line.  He attended the Massachusetts Institute of Technology, before leaving to work in New York City.  He trained with several architects, including Richard Morris Hunt in 1886.  In 1888 he opened his own office, but soon relocated to Providence to work for Stone, Carpenter & Willson, where he gained a high level of responsibility.  He and Hall left in early 1893, and established Martin & Hall of February 1, 1893.  He remained a member of the firm until his death in 1917.

George Frederic Hall was born in Providence in 1866.  He went to work for Stone, Carpenter & Willson in the 1880s.  His employers allowed Hall to take private commissions, including a building for the Narragansett Boat Club, of which he was a member, in 1891.  Along with Martin, he left in early 1893.  After Martin's 1917 death, Hall continued in private practice.  However, his prominence quickly declined, and he designed no significant buildings until 1927, when he was commissioned to design the William H. Hall Free Library in Cranston.  During that time he also served as the supervising architect on the Industrial Trust Building.  He died in 1928.

Major works
In Providence, Rhode Island:
 Museum of Natural History, Roger Williams Park, Providence, Rhode Island (1893)
 St. Maria's Home for Working Girls, 125 Governor St., Providence, Rhode Island (1893) - Now apartments.
 Elbert E. White House, 214 Olney St., Providence, Rhode Island (1894)
 William H. Low, Jr. House, 243 Knight St., Providence, Rhode Island (1894)
 St. Francis Xavier Academy, 60 Broad St., Providence, Rhode Island (1894) - Now Xavier Hall of Johnson & Wales University.
 Champlin Building, 291 Weybosset St., Providence, Rhode Island (1895) - Demolished.
 Joseph Banigan House, 500 Angell St., Providence, Rhode Island (1895) - Demolished.
 Rhode Island Normal School, Promenade St., Providence, Rhode Island (1895) - Demolished.
 Broad Street Grammar School, Broad & Eddy Sts., Providence, Rhode Island (1896)
 Classical High School, 124 Pond St., Providence, Rhode Island (1896) - Demolished.
 Dalrymple Boathouse, Roger Williams Park, Providence, Rhode Island (1896)
 Hope Street High School, 331 Hope St., Providence, Rhode Island (1897) - Demolished.
 Nathan B. Barton House, 63 Orchard Ave., Providence, Rhode Island (1897)
 William H. Low Building, 229 Westminster St., Providence, Rhode Island (1897)
 Winslow Building, 183 Mathewson St., Providence, Rhode Island (1897)
 Alice Building, 250 Westminster St., Providence, Rhode Island (1898)
 Parish House/Rectory for St. Joseph's R. C. Church, 92 Hope St., Providence, Rhode Island (1898)
 Frank H. Martin House, 43 Orchard Ave., Providence, Rhode Island (1899) - The home of the architect.
 George C. Lyon House, 93 Arlington Ave., Providence, Rhode Island (1899)
 George F. Hall House, 49 Orchard Ave., Providence, Rhode Island (1899) - The home of the architect.
 Webster Memorial Guildhouse (St. Stephen's Episcopal Church), 114 George St., Providence, Rhode Island (1899)
 Frederick A. Ballou House, 366 Olney St., Providence, Rhode Island (1900)
 Walter L. Preston House, 249 Hope St., Providence, Rhode Island (1900)
 Central Fire Station, 1 Exchange Ter., Providence, Rhode Island (1901) - Demolished.
 Irons & Russel Building, 95 Chestnut St., Providence, Rhode Island (1903)
 Shepard Stores, 255 Westminster St./80 Washington St., Providence, Rhode Island (1903)
 Receiving Tomb, North Burial Ground, Providence, Rhode Island (1903)
 Webster Avenue Grammar School, Webster Ave. & Clarence St., Providence, Rhode Island (1905)
 Harkness Building, 46 Aborn St., Providence, Rhode Island (1906)
 Branch Avenue Primary School, 425 Branch Ave., Providence, Rhode Island (1909)
 Emma K. Jewett House, 259 Wayland Ave., Providence, Rhode Island (1909)
 Providence City Hospital, 151 Eaton St., Providence, Rhode Island (1910) - Later renamed Charles V. Chapin Hospital, now part of Providence College.
 Edwin A. Smith Building, 1 Fulton St., Providence, Rhode Island (1912)
 Kinsley Building, 334 Westminster St., Providence, Rhode Island (1912)
 Comfort Stations, Weybosset St. and Kennedy Plaza, Providence, Rhode Island (1913)
 Robert J. B. Sullivan House, 350 Wayland Ave., Providence, Rhode Island (1914)
 O'Connor Apartments, 234-242 President Ave., Providence, Rhode Island (1916)
Elsewhere in Rhode Island:
 Y. M. C. A. Building, 450 Hope St., Bristol, Rhode Island (1898) - Wallis Eastburn Howe was the architect-in-charge.
 Squantum Association, 1 Squantum Rd., Riverside, Rhode Island (1899)
 Dreadnaught Fire Station, 72 Church St., Bristol, Rhode Island (1900)
 Felseck (William O. Blanding Estate), 26 Wickham Rd., Newport, Rhode Island (1901)
 Better known as the estate of William Astor Bristed, Jr., a later owner.
 Belton Court (Frederick S. Peck Estate), 27 Middle Hwy., Barrington, Rhode Island (1905)
 Reception Hospital, Rhode Island Hospital for Mental Diseases, Howard, Rhode Island (1910) - Vacant and deteriorating.
 Leander R. Peck High School, 281 County Rd., Barrington, Rhode Island (1916) - Now used as the public library.
 Yellow Patch (Kate R. Richardson Cottage), 115 Central St., Narragansett Pier, Rhode Island (1916)
In Massachusetts:
 St. John's Episcopal Church, 80 Lexington St., East Boston, Massachusetts (1897) - Now East Boston APAC Headstart.
 Casino, Capron Park, Attleboro, Massachusetts (1902)
 Kennedy Building, 142 Main St., Brockton, Massachusetts (1916)

Style
Stylistically, Martin & Hall were very typical.  They were very capable, but not very original.  They favored the popular styles of the day: the Colonial and Gothic Revivals.  When faced with a major civic commission, they would use an aggrandizing Beaux-Arts design.  

Their commercial buildings are among their most refined, the Shepard and Smith Buildings in particular.  The Smith, especially, used a very sophisticated interpretation of the Chicago School, in the manner of Holabird & Roche.

Other than this, the work of Martin & Hall trends toward wooden residences, usually Colonial Revival.  Though plain and unremarkable, they add to the essence of the city.

Associated Architects
Ambrose J. Murphy (1890-1897)
John F. Hogan (1919-1923)

Gallery

References

Additional Links
Central Fire Station

Architecture firms based in Rhode Island
Companies based in Providence, Rhode Island
Design companies established in 1893
Design companies disestablished in 1917
1893 establishments in Rhode Island
1917 disestablishments in Rhode Island